Thangam Elizabeth Rachel Debbonaire ( Singh; born 3 August 1966) is a British Labour Party politician, serving as Shadow Leader of the House of Commons since May 2021. She was previously the Shadow Secretary of State for Housing from 2020 to 2021. She was elected Member of Parliament (MP) for Bristol West at the 2015 general election, when she defeated the incumbent Liberal Democrat MP Stephen Williams. Shortly after being elected, Debbonaire was diagnosed with breast cancer, and did not attend a parliamentary vote from June 2015 until March 2016.

She was appointed shadow Arts and Culture Minister in January 2016, but resigned on 27 June 2016 owing to her lack of confidence in the Labour Party Leader, Jeremy Corbyn. She rejoined his frontbench team as a whip in October that year, before being made Shadow Brexit Minister in January 2020.

Early life and education 
Debbonaire was born in Peterborough on 3 August 1966 to a father of Indian and Sri Lankan Tamil family origin and an English mother. She was educated at two private schools, Bradford Girls' Grammar School and Chetham's School of Music. She then took the first stage of a mathematics degree at the University of Oxford, leaving before graduating, while at the same time training as a cellist at the Royal College of Music. She went to St John's City College of Technology, Manchester. Subsequently, she gained an MSc in Management, Development and Social Responsibility at the University of Bristol.

In her twenties, she changed her name by deed poll from Singh to Debbonaire, borrowed from a relative from her first marriage.

Early career 
Before becoming an MP, she performed professionally as a classical cellist, including for the Royal Liverpool Philharmonic Orchestra. She has worked as National Children's Officer for the Women's Aid Federation of England, for which she moved to St Werburghs in Bristol in 1991, and later as an Accreditation Officer, Fundraising Manager, then National Research Manager for Respect, an anti-domestic violence organisation.

She has co-authored two books, and a number of papers, about domestic violence. In 2004, Debbonaire and her husband, Kevin Walton, co-authored (along with Emilie Debbonaire) a report for Ireland's Department of Justice, Equality and Law Reform entitled Evaluation of work with domestic abusers in Ireland.

Parliamentary career
At the 2015 general election, Debbonaire was selected as a Labour candidate via an all-women shortlist for the constituency of Bristol West. She was elected with a majority of 5,673 votes, defeating incumbent Liberal Democrat MP Stephen Williams, who finished in third place after the Green Party.

Debbonaire was diagnosed with breast cancer on 16 June 2015. She subsequently called on Parliament to allow MPs to vote remotely after she was unable to participate in votes during her recovery.

During her treatment period she was appointed as Shadow Arts and Culture Minister by Jeremy Corbyn. According to Debbonaire, she found out about the role when a journalist contacted her in hospital in response to a Labour press release announcing that she was taking it on, and was then briefly removed from the position before she got a chance to meet with Corbyn. According to Debbonaire's colleague Chi Onwurah, whose frontbench portfolio was briefly split with hers, Corbyn's communication with both women, directly or indirectly, was practically non-existent.

Debbonaire resigned from her role on 27 June 2016 following a series of other resignations, saying that she did not believe Corbyn was the right person to lead the Labour Party into the next election. She also opposed Corbyn's call for Article 50 to be triggered on the day immediately following the referendum on the European Union. Debbonaire's resignation attracted criticism in her Constituency Labour Party (CLP), with some concerned members accusing her of being a liar, a "traitor", and a "scab". Debbonaire endorsed Owen Smith in the 2016 Labour leadership election. After Corbyn defeated Smith, on 12 October 2016, Debbonaire accepted an appointment as a shadow whip in Corbyn's frontbench team.

Debbonaire was reelected in the 2017 general election with an increased majority of 37,336 votes; this was the fourth-largest majority by vote size nationally. Bristol West had been the number one target for the Green Party, which slipped to third place behind the Conservatives with a 12.9% vote share. Debbonaire had resisted calls from the Green Party for her to stand aside as part of a progressive alliance. The size of Debbonaire's majority was considered a shock, as the seat had been billed as a four-way marginal.

On 15 September 2017, Debbonaire held what is thought to be the UK's first constituency surgery specifically for people on the autism spectrum.

In the same month, she urged local constituency members discontented about her resignation to stop planning her deselection, which she claimed was "a catastrophic waste of time".

On 9 May 2021, Debbonaire was moved from the post of Shadow Secretary of State for Housing to Shadow Leader of the House of Commons in a shadow cabinet reshuffle.

Views 
Debbonaire describes herself as a "northern European socialist – a democratic socialist". She supports "fettered capitalism".

Debbonaire opposes the decriminalisation of prostitution and has called for more funding and research to help reform male perpetrators of domestic violence. She supports mandatory education classes in female equality for newly arrived male refugees, as well as more English language support for refugees as part of a broader integration strategy. She has called on Bristol City Council to stop issuing licences to strip clubs in the city. Debbonaire has also called for student accommodation providers to pay council tax.

Brexit 

Before the 2016 referendum on the UK's membership of the European Union, Debbonaire endorsed remaining in the EU. Bristol West voted to remain in the European Union by 79.3%; this was the third-highest percentage result for the Remain campaign by parliamentary constituency.

On 27 January 2017, Debbonaire stated that she would vote against triggering Article 50, despite being a whip herself and Labour imposing a three-line whip to vote for the government motion. She explained that this was because the government intended to leave "the Single Market or something close to it". On 29 June 2017, Debbonaire abstained from voting in an amendment by Chuka Umunna to the Queen's Speech which would have kept the UK in the Single Market and held a vote on the final Brexit deal; her abstention was criticised by Molly Scott Cato, the local Green Party candidate in the 2017 general election. Debbonaire defended her abstention, stating that she had supported a similar amendment drafted by Labour. She affirmed: "I will do everything I can to stop the UK from leaving the EU."

In December 2017, Debbonaire criticised the quality of the Brexit impact papers published by David Davis, then the Brexit Secretary. She stated that the sectoral analyses "wouldn't get an A grade...if [the government] were submitting it as GCSE research" and believed that the papers only compiled information already publicly available. She accused the government of "a dereliction of duty".

In July 2018, Debbonaire said that she did not support a referendum on the Brexit deal. She was criticised by Vince Cable, the leader of the Liberal Democrats. In response, Debbonaire said that there was insufficient public support for a final vote on the deal, and she accused the Liberal Democrats of "playing politics" on the issue.

Drugs reform 
Debbonaire's treatment for breast cancer led her to support greater regulation of alcohol. She supports mandatory graphic health warnings on alcoholic drinks, akin to those on cigarette packaging, and has called for parliamentary debate to raise awareness of the link between alcohol and cancer.

Debbonaire has previously called for an “evidence-based policy review” of the laws around drugs such as ecstasy and marijuana. She supports sending addicted users to mandatory rehabilitation programmes. Debbonaire has also voiced support for "drug consumption rooms", telling ministers that drug-related admissions to Bristol Royal Infirmary cost the NHS £1.3 million per year. On 10 July 2018, Debbonaire co-launched a campaign for drugs policy reform alongside fellow Labour whip Jeff Smith. The campaign was launched without policy proposals, intended as a forum for Labour members to discuss drugs policy reform. Shortly after launching the campaign, Debbonaire called for drug-testing services to be made compulsory at festivals and nightclubs across the UK. She had previously called for a Royal Commission to investigate the impact of drugs and had called for the Prime Minister to watch Drugsland, a BBC documentary on drugs in Bristol.

Harassment
In August 2016, a student at the University of Bristol was investigated after telling Debbonaire to "get in the sea", an Internet meme, which she interpreted as a death threat. Following a complaint to the university by Debbonaire concerning that tweet and others, including one which called her a "traitor", the student apologised, deleted the tweet, and closed her Twitter account. The tweet was posted on the day of the funeral of Jo Cox, another Labour MP, who was murdered in June 2016.

In November 2017, a constituent who harassed Debbonaire was jailed for 20 weeks after leaving multiple "upsetting and disturbing" racially offensive answerphone messages for a senior case worker.

Personal life
Debbonaire is married to Kevin Walton, an opera singer, former actor and a director of Ark Stichting, an Amsterdam charity that works with children with special educational needs.

Since her breast cancer treatment, during which time she read about the links between cancer and alcohol, Debbonaire drinks very little alcohol, is vegan and spent a month in 2017 attempting to live without single-use plastics.

Debbonaire cites music, knitting and observing space as her hobbies. During her treatment for breast cancer, she credited listening to classical music with helping her recovery.

Selected bibliography 

Books
 
Chapters in books
 

Journal articles
 

Papers

References

External links 

1966 births
Alumni of the University of Bristol
Alumni of the University of Oxford
British politicians of Indian descent
English people of Sri Lankan Tamil descent
Female members of the Parliament of the United Kingdom for English constituencies
Labour Party (UK) MPs for English constituencies
Living people
Members of Parliament for Bristol
People educated at Bradford Girls' Grammar School
People educated at Chetham's School of Music
Politics of Bristol
UK MPs 2015–2017
UK MPs 2017–2019
UK MPs 2019–present
21st-century British women politicians
21st-century English women
21st-century English people